Katharine Montagu was the first researcher to identify dopamine in human brains. 
Working in Hans Weil-Malherbe’s laboratory at the Runwell Hospital outside London the presence of dopamine was identified by paper chromatography in the brain of several species, including a human brain. Her research was published in August 1957, followed and confirmed by Hans Weil-Malherbe in November 1957.

Nobel Prize-rewarded Arvid Carlsson is often claimed to be the first researcher to identify dopamine in human brain, however his research was published in November 1957, along with colleagues Margit Linsqvist and Tor Magnusson.

References

British neuroscientists
British women neuroscientists
1966 deaths